2010 LATAM Challenge Series season was the third season of LATAM Challenge Series.

Schedule

Results

Races

LATAM
LATAM Challenge Series races
2010 in Mexican motorsport
2010 in North American sport